Enrico Lando (born 21 July 1966) is an Italian film director and screenwriter.

Filmography
 I soliti idioti: Il film (2011)
 I 2 soliti idioti (2012)
 Amici come noi (2014)
 Quel bravo ragazzo (2016)
 Scappo a casa (2019)

References

External links
 

1966 births
Living people
Film people from Padua
Italian film directors
Italian screenwriters